The Barito River is the second longest river in Borneo after the Kapuas River with a total length of  and  with a drainage basin of  in South Kalimantan, Indonesia. It originates in the Muller Mountain Range, from where it flows southward into the Java Sea. Its most important affluent is the Martapura River, and it passes through the city of Banjarmasin.

This river is the location of the closest relative of the Malagasy language of Madagascar, the Ma'anyan language of Dayaks, from where settlers arrived in Madagascar (presumably in waves) from the 3rd to 10th century and from which the current island nation's population largely traces its origins.

Geography
The river flows in the southeast area of Borneo with predominantly tropical rainforest climate (designated as Af in the Köppen-Geiger climate classification). The wettest month is December, with an average of  rainfall, and the driest is September, with a  rainfall.

Images

See also
List of rivers of Indonesia
List of rivers of Kalimantan

References

External links 

Landforms of South Kalimantan
Rivers of South Kalimantan
Rivers of Central Kalimantan
Rivers of Indonesia